Enrica is a feminine Italian given name. Notable people with the name include:

Enrica Antonioni (born 1952), Italian film director and actress
Enrica Bonaccorti (born 1949), Italian actress
Enrica Calabresi (1891–1944), Italian zoologist
Enrica Cipolloni (born 1990), Italian heptathlete
Enrica Detragiache, American economist
Enrica Clay Dillon (1885–1946), American opera singer, director and voice teacher
Enrica Merlo (born 1988), Italian volleyball player
Enrica Maria Modugno (born 1958), Italian actress
Enrica Piccoli (born 1999), Italian synchronized swimmer
Enrica Soma (1929–1969), American socialite and model
Enrica von Handel-Mazzetti (1871–1955), Austrian poet and writer
Enrica Zunic', Italian writer

See also
Enrica Lexie, an Italian Aframax oil-tanker

Italian feminine given names